The 1873 FA Cup final was a football match between Wanderers and Oxford University on 29 March 1873 at Lillie Bridge in London.  It was the second final of the world's oldest football competition, the Football Association Challenge Cup (known in the modern era as the FA Cup).  Unusually, the final was held in the morning, so as to avoid a clash with the annual Oxford-Cambridge Boat Race which was held on the same day.  Wanderers reached the final without playing a match, as the original rules of the competition stated that the holders would receive a bye straight to the final and other teams would compete to gain the other place in the final and challenge the holders for the trophy.  Oxford reached the final when their semi-final opponents, Queen's Park, dropped out of the competition

Both teams had key players absent for the final, including several who had represented Wanderers in the previous year's final.  The best player on the day was Arthur Kinnaird, who scored the first goal for Wanderers.  Charles Wollaston added a second goal towards the end of the match to give Wanderers a 2–0 victory and a second consecutive FA Cup win. It was the only Cup final prior to 1893 not played at The Oval.

Route to the final 

As the previous year's FA Cup winners, Wanderers received a bye straight to the final in the 1872–73.  This was in keeping with the original concept of the competition being a "challenge cup", in which the holders would qualify directly for the following season's final and teams would compete for the other place in the final and the right to challenge them for the trophy. This was the only time this rule was used.

In the first round Oxford University played Crystal Palace (a defunct former amateur club not thought to be connected to the current professional club of the same name) and won 3–2 at home. In the second round, they played an away match against Clapham Rovers, winning 3–0.

In the third round Oxford University were paired with the previous season's runners-up, the Royal Engineers.  Oxford won 1–0 and went on to play Maidenhead in the quarter-finals.  Due to other teams receiving byes, this was the only match at the quarter-final stage, and for the third consecutive round Oxford emerged victorious without conceding a goal, winning 4–0. In the semi-finals, Oxford's opponents were set to be the leading Scottish club, Queen's Park, who had received a bye straight to the semi-finals to reduce the amount of travelling required to compete in a competition in which all the other entrants were from the south of England. Queen's, however, decided to withdraw from the competition, giving Oxford a bye into the final. At least one modern source states that the Scottish club actually beat Oxford but then could not afford to travel to London for the final so withdrew at that point.

Match

Summary

As the match was scheduled for the same day as the annual Oxford-Cambridge boat race, the decision was made to stage it in the morning, thereby allowing the spectators to witness both sporting events. Both teams were missing key players.  Oxford's first-choice goalkeeper, Charles Nepean, was unavailable, as were four of Wanderers' regular players, including Thomas Hooman, William Crake and Albert Thompson, all of whom had been in the cup-winning team the year before. As cup-holders, Wanderers were permitted to choose the stadium at which the match would be played.  As the club had no official stadium of its own, its officials chose the Lillie Bridge ground in West Brompton.

Oxford dominated the early stages of the game due largely to the strong running of Arnold Kirke-Smith.  Newspaper The Sportsman commented that "the whole eleven work[ed] well together and with great energy". Nonetheless, Wanderers came closer to scoring when William Kenyon-Slaney got the ball into the goal, only for the umpires to disallow the goal due to an infringement of the offside rule.  After 27 minutes, Wanderers captain Arthur Kinnaird, whom the press rated as the best player of the match due to his dribbling skills, gave his team the lead when he outpaced Oxford's backs and kicked the ball between the goalposts.

In a desperate attempt to secure an equalising goal, Oxford took the unusual step of dispensing with the use of a goalkeeper and moved Andrew Leach, who had been playing in that position, upfield to play as a forward. This plan back-fired at around the 80-minute mark, however, when Charles Wollaston broke through and scored a second goal for the Wanderers, who thereby retained the trophy which they had won in its inaugural year. The correspondent from The Field stated that the shot would easily have been saved had there been a player in goal.

Details

Match rules
 90 minutes normal time.
 30 minutes extra-time if scores are level, at captains' discretion.
 Replay if scores still level.
 No substitutes.

Post-match
As was the norm until 1882, the winning team did not receive the trophy at the stadium on the day of the match, but later in the year at their annual dinner. Oxford's sporting disappointment continued in the afternoon, as the university's crew was defeated by three lengths by Cambridge in the Boat Race, Cambridge's fourth successive victory in the contest.

References
General

Specific

External links
 Line-ups

1873
FA
1873 sports events in London
Oxford University A.F.C. matches
March 1873 sports events